Gustavo Adolfo Sánchez is a Colombian artistic swimmer. He won two gold medals in the solo free routine at the 2022 Artistic Swimming World Series as well as a bronze medal in the mixed duet technical routine. His gold medal in the solo free routine at the Paris stop of the 2022 World Series marked the first gold medal won by an artistic swimmer representing Colombia at a FINA Artistic Swimming World Series. He is a 2022 Bolivarian Games champion in the mixed duet routine. At World Aquatic Championships, he placed sixth in the mixed duet technical routine in 2022 and eighth in 2019, as well as sixth in the mixed duet free routine in 2022 and eighth in 2019.

Background
Sánchez was born 31 August 2000 in Cali, Colombia. He dreams that one day the Olympic Games will include men in artistic swimming, which has been omitted from the Olympic program in both men-only and mixed gender duet events as least through the 2024 Summer Olympics. He was unaffected by the allowance of up to two men to compete in the team event (featuring eight team event members) at the 2024 Olympic Games as the International Olympic Committee also continued barring the entrance of men in the sport in solo and duet events. For his collegiate studies, he attends Javeriana University in Cali, where he studies visual communication design.

Career

2019 World Aquatics Championships

On the second day of the 2019 World Aquatics Championships in Gwangju, South Korea in July, Sánchez and his partner Jennifer Cerquera Hatiusca ranked eighth in the preliminaries of the mixed duet technical routine, qualifying for the final two days later with a score of 76.1453 that included a minus 1.0 penalty incurred during the performance. In the final, they placed eighth with a score of 77.5388 points, penalty free. Day eight of competition, he and Cerquera Hatiusca qualified for the final of the mixed duet free routine, with a score of 78.5667 points in the preliminaries. For the final the following day, the duo placed eighth, scoring 78.7000 points with no penalty.

2022

2022 Artistic Swimming World Series
On the second day of competition for the second leg of the 2022 FINA Artistic Swimming World Series, held in April at
Piscine Georges Vallerey in Paris, France, Sánchez won the gold medal in the solo free routine with a score of 80.8667 points for his performance choreographed in the theme of "The Joker". This was the first-ever gold medal at a FINA Artistic Swimming World Series won by an artistic swimmer representing Colombia. The third and final day, he started off with a bronze medal-winning performance in the mixed duet technical routine with his partner Jennifer Cerquera Hatiusca, performing to the song "Age of Gods" by Thomas Bergersen with a theme of "Constellations" to score 77.7850 points. He finished the day off in the mixed duet free routine with the same partner, placing fourth with a score of 80.2667 points.

In his first event of the fourth leg of the World Series, hosted in a virtual format by Australia in May, he and Cerquera Hatiusca placed fifth with a score of 75.3905 points, finishing less than four points behind the bronze medal-winning duo representing Kazakhstan. For his second event, he competed in the solo free routine, performing his "The Joker" theme choreography to win the gold medal with a score of 77.4667 points and outscoring the silver medalist Javier Ruisanchez of Puerto Rico by over 14 points. The final event he competed in for the World Series was the mixed duet free routine on the fourth leg of the World Series, where he and Cerquera Hatiusca scored 77.3667 points and placed fifth.

2022 World Aquatics Championships

Sánchez entered to compete in 100% of events open to men, two mixed gender events, in artistic swimming competition at the 2022 World Aquatics Championships in Budapest, Hungary, with his partner Jennifer Cerquera Hatiusca. On the second day of competition, 18 June, he and his partner achieved their highest rank finish in a preliminary or final at a FINA World Aquatics Championships ever, qualifying for the final and ranking sixth in the preliminaries of the mixed duet technical routine with a score of 78.5003 points. In the final, he and his partner improved their marks by over two full points and achieved a sixth-place finish with a score of 81.2272 points, which was their highest place finish and highest score in a final at a FINA World Aquatics Championships in any mixed duet event. For their second of two events, the mixed duet free routine, they achieved a new personal best score at a World Championships of 81.4667 points, ranked sixth overall, and qualified for the final. They further improved their personal best score in the final, placing sixth with a score of 83.0667 points.

2022 Bolivarian Games

At the 2022 Bolivarian Games, held in Valledupar less than a week after the conclusion of artistic swimming competition at the World Championships, Sánchez won a gold medal in the mixed duet routine, scoring 75.943 points for the technical competency and 78.350 for the free competency.

International championships

See also
 Colombia at the 2019 World Aquatics Championships
 2022 FINA Artistic Swimming World Series

References

External links
 

2000 births
Living people
Colombian male swimmers
Colombian synchronized swimmers
Male synchronized swimmers
Sportspeople from Cali
Artistic swimmers at the 2019 World Aquatics Championships
21st-century Colombian people